Gros Cap 49 is a First Nations reserve located near Wawa, Ontario. It is one of four reserves of the Michipicoten First Nation.

References

Ojibwe reserves in Ontario
Communities in Algoma District